Kreuter is a German surname.
Chad Kreuter
 (1813-1889), German architect and civil engineer
Frauke Kreuter, German sociologist and statistician
Helga Kreuter-Eggemann (1914 - 1970), German art historian involved in looting art in France during WWII

See also

Kräuter
Kreuther
Kreuter Manufacturing Company

German-language surnames
de:Kreuter